Suspension arm may refer to:

 control arm, a suspension comportment which is mounted at two points on the body of a vehicle
 suspension link, a suspension component which is mounted at only one point on the body of a vehicle